Manav Rachna International Institute of Research and Studies (MRIIRS), formerly Manav Rachna International University (MRIU), is a private university located in Faridabad, Mohali and many more places in India.

Accreditation
Manav Rachna International Institute of Research and Studies (MRIIRS) is a National Assessment and Accreditation Council (NAAC) accredited A-grade university. It was granted the Deemed university status under Section 3 of the UGC Act 1956, as Manav Rachna International University.

Campus

Faridabad campus
There are buildings for engineering, applied sciences, and business studies. There is an auditorium and central library. Students live in hostels with a separate facility for international students. An indoor sports hall was officially opened by Abhinav Bindra in 2010.

Sonipat campus
The university is scheduled to expand to Rajiv Gandhi Education City, Sonipat, in 2018.

Dr. O. P. Bhalla Central Library
The university has a central library with books, journals, and digital learning resources.

Admissions
For undergraduate applicants, Manav Rachna accepts the MRNAT (Manav Rachna National Aptitude Test), the (Uni-GAUGE-E), and the SAT in its admissions processes for domestic and international applicants.

B.Tech.
In addition to the tests above, admission to B.Tech. courses is primarily through results obtained in the All India Engineering Entrance Exam conducted by the Central Board of Secondary Education every year. Over one thousand students are accepted into the first year of B.Tech. programs annually.

Students with a three-year diploma from a recognised polytechnic in the state can apply for direct admission to the second year of the B.Tech. program through an online exam organised by the MRIU.

M.Tech.
Admission to the M.Tech. programme is evaluated on the basis of performance in the Graduate Aptitude Test in Engineering (GATE).

M.C.A.
Admission to this program is via the Online Entrance Test for Master of Computer Applications (OLET-MCA) conducted by Haryana State Counseling Society (HSCS).

MBA
Admissions to the three year MBA course require a bachelor's or postgraduate degree (or equivalent) and taking the Management Aptitude Test (MAT) conducted by the All India Management Association (AIMA).

Rankings

The National Institutional Ranking Framework (NIRF) ranked it  among engineering colleges in 2021. In Outlook India's 2021 ICARE ranking of the top 100 private engineering schools in India, MRIIRS placed .

Examination system
Each academic year is divided into two semesters. Each semester has two internal exams (sessional exams) and one final exam (semester exam) for all theory subjects. For laboratory courses there is one internal exam followed by the final semester exam. Most of the exams are theoretical like most other engineering colleges in India.

Training and placement
The university has a Training and Placement department that helps its graduates find employment. The Corporate Resource Centre connects students with employers.

Research activities 
Between 2006 and 2011, the faculty of the university published 643 research publications in national and international journals and conferences.

Notable alumni

 Roopam Sharma - Research Scientist and Innovator
 Srishti Rana - Model and Miss Asia Pacific World 2013
 Abhishek Verma - Athlete in shooting and has received many awards in the games for his ability.

References

External links 
 

Education in Faridabad
Engineering colleges in Haryana
Deemed universities in India
Universities in Haryana